The 1962–63 Algerian Cup is the First edition of the Algerian Cup.

Round of 64

Round of 32

Round of 16

Quarter-finals

Semi-finals

Final

Match

Match

References

Algerian Cup
Algerian Cup
Algerian Cup